This is the order of battle for the Belgian Army armoured units in May 1940

Notes and references

Armoured fighting vehicles of Belgium
Army units and formations of Belgium in World War II
Battle of Belgium